2008 U-League was the first season for university football teams in South Korea. The competition included ten university football teams in Seoul National Capital Area. The season began on 1 May, and ended on 3 November 2008.

League standing

Results

Awards
 Fair Play Team : Hanyang University
 Most Valuable Player : Lee Ho (Kyunghee University)
 Valuable Player : Ahn Joon-Hyuk (Hanyang University)
 Fair Play Player : Jung Woo-Sung (Chung-Ang University)
 Top Goalscorer : Ko Kyung-Min (Hanyang University)
 Best Defender : Park Sang-Jin (Kyunghee University)
 Best Goalkeeper : Jung Sung-Yoon (Kyunghee University)
 Best Coach : Kim Kwang-Jin (Kyunghee University)

U-League (association football)